The Men's 400 metres T54 event at the 2016 Summer Paralympics took place at the Estádio Olímpico João Havelange on 11 and 12 September. It featured 20 athletes.

Records
Prior to the competition, the existing World and Paralympic records were as follows:

Results

Heats
Qualification rule: The first two finishers in each heat (Q) and the next two fastest (1) qualify for the final.

Heat 1

Heat 2

Heat 3

Final

References

Athletics at the 2016 Summer Paralympics
2016 in men's athletics